Quentin Bryan Angus is a jazz guitarist from Australia.

Career
Angus holds a PhD, a Master of Music degree, and a Bachelor of Music Degree from the Elder Conservatorium, University of Adelaide. He has produced two independently released albums, Retrieval Structure (2011) and Perception (2013). His quintet has performed at Jazz Hoeilaart in Belgium and Europafest in Romania.

He has written three transcription books of Gilad Hekselman's Improvisations from his albums; Split-Life, Words Unspoken and 'Hearts Wide Open' were published by Mel Bay, JazzHeaven, the NZMiC music journal, and has presented research papers on his transcriptions of Hekselman and John Abercrombie at music conferences in New Zealand and Australia.

Awards and honors
He is the inaugural winner of the APRA Art Music Award for Excellence In Jazz in 2012.

He received the Helpmann Academy's Keith Michell Award in 2010, The first time a jazz musician had ever won the award. He has also won Downbeat Jazz Awards for 'Jazz Soloist' in 2012 and 2014  and 'Jazz Composition' in 2011, 2012 and 2014.  He has also been part of The Betty Carter Jazz Ahead residency at the Kennedy Center, Washington DC in 2011 and 2013.

References

1987 births
Living people
Australian expatriates in the United States
Australian jazz musicians
APRA Award winners